Tanfield Lea is a village north of Stanley, County Durham, England, and south of Tantobie.

Religious sites
There is a Methodist Church, which also has a village hall.

Industry
The Ever Ready battery company used to be a major employer in the local area, employing over a thousand workers at its peak. The Tanfield Lea factory was closed in 1996, following the take over of British Ever Ready by the American company Ralston Purina in 1992.

References

Villages in County Durham
Stanley, County Durham